Ordzhonikidzevsky District may refer to:
Ordzhonikidzevsky District, Russia, name of several districts and city districts in Russia
Ordzhonikidzivsky Raion, former name of a city district in Mariupol, Ukraine
Ordzhonikidzivsky Raion, former name of a city district in Zaporizhzhia, Ukraine

District name disambiguation pages